The 1993 BYU Cougars football team represented Brigham Young University (BYU) in the 1993 NCAA Division I-A football season.

Schedule

Roster

Season summary

Utah

Holiday Bowl (vs Ohio State)

References

BYU
BYU Cougars football seasons
Western Athletic Conference football champion seasons
BYU Cougars football